Golfer's vasculitis, exercise-induced vasculitis and hiker's rash are names proposed by different medical researchers for a form of vasculitis resulting in a purpuric rash (bleeding from underlying tissues). It is often experienced in the lower legs caused by excessive exercise in hotter temperatures. It is more common among older people.

It is called 'Golfer's' due to a large amount of walking done in golf, as well as it being a sport more popular among older people, resulting in greater incidence of the condition.

References

Further reading

External links
 About.com article about Golfer's vasculitis

Rheumatology
Inflammations
Vascular-related cutaneous conditions